In graph theory, Turán's theorem bounds the number of edges that can be included in an undirected graph that does not have a complete subgraph of a given size. It is one of the central results of extremal graph theory, an area studying the largest or smallest graphs with given properties, and is a special case of the forbidden subgraph problem on the maximum number of edges in a graph that does not have a given subgraph.

An example of an -vertex graph that does not contain any -vertex clique  may be formed by partitioning the set of  vertices into  parts of equal or nearly equal size, and connecting two vertices by an edge whenever they belong to two different parts. The resulting graph is the Turán graph . Turán's theorem states that the Turán graph has the largest number of edges among all -free -vertex graphs.

Turán's theorem, and the Turán graphs giving its extreme case, were first described and studied by Hungarian mathematician Pál Turán in 1941. The special case of the theorem for triangle-free graphs is known as Mantel's theorem; it was stated in 1907 by Willem Mantel, a Dutch mathematician.

Statement
Turán's theorem states that every graph  with  vertices that does not contain  as a subgraph has at most as many edges as the Turán graph .

Proofs
 list five different proofs of Turán's theorem.

Many of the proofs involve reducing to the case where the graph is a complete multipartite graph, and showing that the number of edges is maximized when there are  parts of size as close as possible to equal. This step can be done

Induction 

This was Turán's original proof. Take a -free graph on  vertices with the maximal number of edges.

Now, one can bound edges above as follows:

 There are exactly  edges within .

Adding these bounds gives the result.

Maximal Degree Vertex 
This proof is due to Paul Erdős. Take the vertex  of largest degree.

This increases the number of vertices by our maximality assumption and keeps the graph -free.

Repeating this argument eventually produces a graph in the same form as a Turán graph, which is a collection of independent sets, with edges between each two vertices from different independent sets. A simple calculation shows that the number of edges of this graph is maximized when all independent set sizes are as close to equal as possible.

Complete Multipartite Optimization 
This proof, as well as the Zykov Symmetrization proof, involve reducing to the case where the graph is a complete multipartite graph, and showing that the number of edges is maximized when there are  independent sets of size as close as possible to equal. This step can be done as follows:

Let  be the independent sets of the multipartite graph. Since two vertices have an edge between them if and only if they are not in the same independent set, the number of edges is

where the left hand side follows from direct counting, and the right hand side follows from complementary counting. To show the  bound, applying the Cauchy–Schwarz inequality to the  term on the right hand side suffices, since .

To prove the Turán Graph is optimal, one can argue that no two  differ by more than one in size. This can be seen by examining the changes to either side of the above expression for the number of edges, or by noting that the degree of the moved vertex increases.

Lagrangian 
They begin by considering a  free graph with vertices labelled , and considering maximizing the functionover all nonnegative  with sum . This function is known as the Lagrangian of the graph and its edges.

Hence, one can either replace  with either  or  without decreasing the value of the function. Hence, there is a point with at most  nonzero variables where the function is maximized.

Now, the Cauchy–Schwarz inequality gives that the maximal value is at most  .

Probabilistic Method 
The key claim in this proof was independently found by Caro and Wei. This proof is due to Noga Alon and Joel Spencer, from their book The Probabilistic Method. The proof shows that every graph with degrees  has an independent set of size at leastThe proof attempts to find such an independent set as follows:
 Consider a random permutation of the vertices of a -free graph
 Select every vertex that is adjacent to none of the vertices before it.

A vertex of degree  is included in this with probability , so this process gives an average of  vertices in the chosen set.

Applying this fact to the complement graph and bounding the size of the chosen set using the Cauchy–Schwarz inequality proves Turán's theorem. See  for more.

Zykov Symmetrization 
Aigner and Ziegler call the final one of their five proofs "the most beautiful of them all". Its origins are unclear, but the approach is often referred to as Zykov Symmetrization as it was used in Zykov's proof of a generalization of Turán's Theorem . This proof goes by taking a -free graph, and applying steps to make it more similar to the Turán Graph while increasing edge count.

In particular, given a -free graph, the following steps are applied:

Repeat this until all non-adjacent vertices have the same degree.

All of these steps keep the graph  free while increasing the number of edges.

Now, non-adjacency forms an equivalence relation. The equivalence classes give that any maximal graph the same form as a Turán graph. As in the maximal degree vertex proof, a simple calculation shows that the number of edges is maximized when all independent set sizes are as close to equal as possible.

Mantel's theorem

A strengthened form of Mantel's theorem states that any Hamiltonian graph with at least  edges must either be the complete bipartite graph  or it must be pancyclic: not only does it contain a triangle, it must also contain cycles of all other possible lengths up to the number of vertices in the graph.

Another strengthening of Mantel's theorem states that the edges of every -vertex graph may be covered by at most  cliques which are either edges or triangles. As a corollary, the graph's intersection number (the minimum number of cliques needed to cover all its edges) is at most .

Generalizations

Other Forbidden Subgraphs 
The Erdős–Stone theorem finds the number of edges up to a  error in all other graphs:(Erdős–Stone) Suppose  is a graph with chromatic number .

Maximizing Other Quantities 
Another natural extension of Turán's theorem is the following question: if a graph has no s, how many copies of  can it have? Turán's theorem is the case where . Zykov's Theorem answers this question:(Zykov's Theorem) The graph on  vertices with no s and the largest possible number of s is the Turán graph This was first shown by Zykov (1949) using Zykov Symmetrization.

A paper by Alon and Shikhelman in 2016 gives the following generalization, which is similar to the Erdos-Stone generalization of Turán's theorem:(Alon-Shikhelman, 2016) Let  be a graph with chromatic number .

Edge-Clique region 
Turan's theorem states that if a graph has edge homomorphism density strictly above , it has a nonzero number of s. One could ask the far more general question: if you are given the edge density of a graph, what can you say about the density of s?

An issue with answering this question is that for a given density, there may be some bound not attained by any graph, but approached by some infinite sequence of graphs. To deal with this, weighted graphs or graphons are often considered. In particular, graphons contain the limit of any infinite sequence of graphs.

For a given edge density , the construction for the largest  density is as follows:Take a number of vertices  approaching infinity. Let  be the integer such that . Take a -partite graph where all parts but the unique smallest part have the same size, and sizes of the parts are chosen such that the total edge density is .For , this gives a graph that is -partite and hence gives no s.

The lower bound was proven by Razborov (2008) for the case of triangles, and was later generalized to all cliques by Reiher (2016). The upper bound is a consequence of the Kruskal–Katona theorem .

See also 
 Erdős–Stone theorem, a generalization of Turán's theorem from forbidden cliques to forbidden Turán graphs

References

Extremal graph theory
Theorems in graph theory
Articles containing proofs